The 2010–11 season was the 37th season in the existence of Al Jazira Club and the club's 13th consecutive season in the top flight of UAE football. This team won the league title for the first time in history after defeating Al-Wasl with four rounds to go.

Players

First-team squad

Competitions

Overall record

UAE Pro League

League table

Results summary

Results by round

Matches

UAE President's Cup

Etisalat Emirates Cup

AFC Champions League

Group stage

Statistics

Goalscorers

References

Al Jazira Club